Assumption Abbey may refer to:

 Assumption Abbey (Missouri)
 Assumption Abbey (North Dakota)